The legendary kings of Denmark are the predecessors of Gorm the Old, a king who reigned ca. 930s to 950s and is the earliest reliably attested Danish ruler. Historicity of the earlier legendary kings are thus half legend and half history. The accounts of the Danish kings are confusing and contradictory, and so this presentation tries to separate the various sources from each other. Different sources  sometimes mention the same kings.

Multiple sources 
Many kings are mentioned by multiple sources, but are for various reasons still considered more legendary than historical kings of Denmark

 Harthacnut (Hardeknud) (c. 916 – c. 936), the father of Gorm the Old according to multiple sources. The main question is whether he was king of Denmark or only king of some part of Denmark. His parentage is also disputed, as either from an unknown king Sweyn, or from either Sigurd Snake-in-the-Eye or king Erik, both said to be children of Ragnar Lodbrok.
 Sigtrygg Gnupasson, deposed c. 916 either by Harthacnut or a contemporary, depending on sources. Likely had base in Schleswig, but the extent of his realm is unknown. Son of Gnupa.
 Gnupa (early 900s). Father of Sigtrygg. According to one source he shared power with his brother Gyrd. According to the Saga of Olaf Tryggvason, he was defeated as one of the minor border kings by Gorm when he united Denmark, though that conflicts with Gnupa's son being deposed by Gorm's father according to other sources.
 Olof the Brash conquered Denmark (or part of Denmark) c. 900.
 Helgi, supposedly deposed by Olaf the Brash.
 Sigurd Snake-in-the-Eye (Sigurd Orm-i-øje or Snogeøje) became king of Zealand and Scania according to the sagas, perhaps correctly named Sigfred and co-ruling as king of Denmark with his brother Halfdan Ragnarsson (d. 877). Mentioned by Chronicon Roskildense and Ragnarssona þáttr. Son of Ragnar Lodbrok.
 Halfdan Ragnarsson (c. 871 – 877), son of Ragnar Lodbrok and older brother of Sigurd Snake-in-the-Eye. Leader of the so called Great Heathen Army of the Anglo-Saxon sources, in 870 and 871. King Bagsecg joined him to become the co-leader of the Great Summer Army of 870 but Bagsecg was killed in battle with the English in January 871. Halfdan succeeded Bagsecg as king of Jutland.
 Bagsecg, Danish king who came to England and was killed in 871.
 Horik II, king from about 854 until about 870.
 Horik I, co-ruler of Denmark from 813, the sole king of Denmark c. 828 to 854. Son of Gudfred.
 Harald Klak, 812 to 813 and 819 to 827, a period of civil war with the sons of Gudfred. Nephew of an earlier Harald.
 Hemming, c. 810 to c. 812. Nephew of Gudfred. Brother of Ragnvald, Håkon and Angantyr.
 Gudfred (Godfred or Gøtrik), a Danish king c. 804 to 810. Said to be father of Ogier the Dane (Holger Danske); possibly the son of Sigfred.
 Ragnar Lodbrok was a legendary king, allegedly flourishing before 865. He is mentioned in multiple sources, but the sources are wildly inconsistent. There is no historical record of anyone named Ragnar ruling Denmark in the 9th century. However his sons Halfdan Ragnarsson and Sigurd Snake-In-the-Eye may have become kings of Denmark, while his son Bjorn Ironside became king of Sweden and Uppsala according to various late sagas.
 Sigfred, Danish king c. 770 to c. 804. Possibly the historical basis for Sigurd Hring. Reported to have assisted the Saxons against Charlemagne.
 Harald Wartooth (Harald Hildetand), legendary king of Denmark, Sweden and parts of Norway, sometimes assigned to c. 715 to c. 770. Mentioned in multiple sources. According to one source his conquests reached as far as the Mediterranean. Said to be grandfather of Ragnar Lodbrok.
 Ongendus was a king of the Danes, reigning c. 710, the first Danish king known from contemporary literature.
 Randver, sometimes assigned to the early 700s. Son of Valdar (or Radbard) according to late sagas; fell in England.
 Valdar, sometimes assigned to the early 700s. Son-in-law of Ivar Vidfamne and sub-king in Denmark according to the late sagas.
 Ivar Vidfamne, sometimes assumed to have died in c. 700. The Viking sagas say that Ivar Vidfamne ruled over most of Denmark, Sweden, Saxland and even parts of England.

Rig and Scylding line 
Early kings of the Rig and Scylding lines, mentioned by multiple sources
 Dan mikilláti, son of Danp, brother-in-law of Domar.
 Fróði mikilláti, son of Dan Mikillati
 Halfdan, son of Fróði
 Hroðgar (Roar), 6th century?, son of Halfdan
 Halga (Helge), 6th century?, son of Halfdan
 Hrólfr Kraki, son of Helga

After Hrólf Kraki no two sources give the same succession.

Adam of Bremen 
Adam of Bremen mentions several kings from the 10th century preceding Gorm the Old. He claims Svend Estridson as his source. Many of these are also confirmed by other sources.
 Helgi
 Olof the Brash (Olav/Ole den Frøkne): mention o. 925
 Gyrd and Gnupa: mention 934
 Sigtrygg Gnupasson (Sigerich): c. 935, but conflicts with Harthacnut's deposition of him about 917
 Harthacnut Very likely preceded Gorm the Old

Gesta Danorum 

The kings from Saxo Grammaticus' chronicle Gesta Danorum ("Deeds of the Danes").

Other Danish kings include:

 Hadingus
 Frotho I
 Haldanus I
 Ro
 Helgo
 Rolvo Krake
 Høtherus (and Balderus)
 Rørikus (the grandfather of Hamlet)
 Wiglecus
 Wermundus
 Uffo
 Dan II
 Huglecus
 Frotho II
 Dan III
 Hiarnus
 Fridlevus I
 Frotho III
 Fridlevus II
 Frotho IV
 Ingellus
 Olavus I
 Haraldus I
 Frotho V
 Haldanus II
 Yngwin
 Sywaldus I
 Sygarus
 Haraldus Hyldetan (Harald Wartooth)
 Ringo
 Olo
 Omundus
 Sywardus I
 Iarmericus
 Broderus
 Sywaldus II
 Snio
 Biorn
 Haraldus III
 Gormo I
 Gudfred
 Olavus II
 Hemmingus
 Siwardus Ring
 Regner Lothbrog
 Siwardus III
 Ericus I
 Ericus II
 Kanutus I
 Frotho VI
 Gormo II
 Haraldus III
 Gormo III

Chronicon Lethrense and Annales Lundenses 
The kings from the Chronicle of Lejre.
 Dan, son of Ypper (a primeval king of Sweden)
 (Hadding) (only referred to)
 Ro (= Haldan)
 Haldanus (= Ro) in Lejre and sea-king Helghe, the sons of Ro (= Haldan)
 A dog king Raki, Rachus or Saurr ruled Denmark on the order of the Swedish king Adils (or Hakon)
 Snyo, son of Frosti
 Rolf Kraki
 Hiartwart
 Haki or Aki, brother of Haghbardus and son of Hamundus
 Fritleff
 Frotha Largus (the Generous)
 Ingyald
 Olavus
 Asa, queen
 Haraldus Hyldetan
 Hetha or Wysna, queen in Hedeby

Other manuscript have a supplementary list, following the name of Hartwar:
 Wig
 Aki
 Hother of Saxland, son of Hodbrod and Hadding's daughter, as nearest heir.
 Rorik Slengeborre or Rake
 Wighlec
 Wermund
 Offe the Strong

Beowulf 
The kings in epic poem Beowulf
 Heremod, a Danish king
 Scyld, a foundling who became king
 Scealdwea (Scealdea), son of Heremod
 Beowa, son of Scyld
 Healfdene, son of Beowa
 Heorogar, son of Healfdene
 Hroðgar, son of Healfdene
 Hroðulf, probably the son of Hroðgar's brother Halga

Gróttasöngr 
The kings in the poem Gróttasöngr
 Skjöldr
 Friðleifr
 Fróði

Skjöldunga saga (partial list) 
The kings of the saga of the Scylding family.

 Scioldus
 Fridleifus I
 Frodo I
 Herleifus
 Havardus
 Leifus
 Herleifus
 Hunleifus
 Aleifus
 Oddleifus
 Geirleifus
 Gunnleifus
 Frodo II
 Vermundus
 Dan I
 Dan II
 Frodo III
 Fridleifus II
 Frodo IV
 Ingjaldus 
 Helgo and Roas
 Rolfo Krake
 Hiorvardus
 Rærecus

Sögubrot 
Sögubrot or  Sǫgubrot af nokkrum fornkonungum Dana ok svíaveldi  is an Old Icelandic saga fragment which is believed to be a part of the original Skjöldunga saga. The fragment begins in the middle of a discussion between the Scanian king Ivar Vidfamne and his daughter Auðr.

Kings of the whole of Denmark or individual Danish regions, which appear in Sögubrot:
 Helgi, (joint ?) king of Zealand
 Hrœrekr Ringslinger (brother of Helgi), king / (co-kingship) of Zealand
 Ivar Vidfamne (the father-in-law of Hrœrekr), King of Scania – later King of Denmark, Sweden, Norway and parts of several adjoining countries.
 Harald Wartooth (grandson of Ivar), he became king after Ivar (possibly identical with the "former" or "senior" King Harald mentioned in connection with the royal Danish brothers Anulo and Harald in the Royal Frankish Annals)
 Hring or Sigurd Hring (nephew of Harald Wartooth), at first king of Sveariket (Beowulf: Swēorice; oldest Swedish form: Swerike), later also king of Denmark (could possibly be identical with king Sigfred).
 At the end of Sögubrot is mentioned Ragnar (Ragnarr) as a son of Sigurd Hring. From other known sources it must be concluded that this Ragnarr is the famous Viking king Ragnar Lodbrok.

Ynglinga saga 
The kings of the saga of the Ynglinga family.
 Skjöldr
 ...
 Frið-Fróði
 ...
 Danr hinn mikilláti
 Fróði hinn mikilláti eða friðsami
 Hálfdan
 Friðleifr
 Áli hinn frækni
 ...
 Fróði hinn frækni
 ...
 Helgi Hálfdanarson
 Hrólfr kraki

Other sources 
 Chlochilaicus: 6th century killed by Theuderic I during a Viking raid in ca 516, mentioned as a Dane though that might have been be a mistake on the author's part. He is called 'Rex Getarum' (King of The Geats) in most accounts and is thought to be Hygelac, mentioned in Beowulf as the King of Geatland.
 Fróði: 6th century or 7th century
 Ongendus (Angantyr): mentioned early 8th century
 Siger: mentioned 8th century
 Sigfred (Sigfred/Sigurd): mentioned 777, d. before 804
 Harold: of Norway?
 Gudfred (Godfred): latest 804 – d. 810
 Eystein fart (Eystein Fjært): of Västergötland?
 Halfdan (Halvdan): of Norway?
 Hemming: d. 811
 Anulo (Anulo/Ring): d. 812
 Sigfrid (Sigfred/Sigurd): d. 812
 Harold: 812–813, 819-827, died in exile
 Eric (Horik/Erik): 812-854
 Halfdan (Halvdan) o. 812, possibly died in exile
 Eric the Child (Horik/Erik Barn): 854- after 864, dead or deposed by 873
 Sigurd Snake-in-the-Eye (Sigurd Orm i Øje): mention 873, d. 903, do coin money by East Anglia
 Halfdan (Halvdan): mention 873, d. 876/877
 Guthfrith (Godred/Canute/Harde-Knud/Gudfred/Gudrød): c. 881, d. 895/896 in Northumbria, do coin money by East Anglia
 Guichtlac: King of the Danes in antiquity.  Cited In Book III of the Historia Regum Britanniae by Geoffry of Monmouth.

For later Danish monarchs whose existence is verified, see List of Danish monarchs

See also 
 List of legendary kings of Sweden
 List of legendary kings of Norway

References 

 
 
Kings
Danish